The 2013 Super League season was the 18th season of rugby league football since the Super League format was introduced in 1996. Fourteen teams competed for the League Leaders' Shield over 27 rounds (including the Magic Weekend), after which the highest finishing teams entered the play-offs to compete for a place in the Grand Final and a chance to win the championship and the Super League Trophy.

Teams
Super League XVIII was the second year of a licensed Super League. Under this system, promotion and relegation between Super League and Championship was abolished, and 14 teams were granted licences subject to certain criteria. For the 2013 season, all fourteen teams from the previous season will compete, including the Bradford Bulls, who were given a one-year probationary licence after going into administration and taken over by the Omar Khan consortium in the 2012 season.

Geographically, the vast majority of teams in Super League are based in the north of England, five teams – Warrington, St. Helens, Salford, Wigan and Widnes – to the west of the Pennines in Cheshire, Greater Manchester and Merseyside, and seven teams to the east in Yorkshire – Huddersfield, Bradford, Wakefield Trinity, Leeds, Castleford, Hull F.C. and Hull Kingston Rovers. Catalans Dragons are the only team based in France and are outside of the UK and London Broncos are the only team to be based in a capital city (London).

The maps below indicate the locations of teams that competed in Super League XVIII.

Dragons

Broncos

Vikings

Saints

Wolves

Warriors

Reds

Hull

Hull KR

Tigers

Rhinos

Wildcats

Bulls

Giants

Rule changes
For the 2013 season, the Rugby Football League has introduced a number of rule changes, which will also apply to the 2013 RFL Championship and Championship 1 seasons. This follows trial runs of the proposed rules during Boxing Day friendlies between Leeds Rhinos and Wakefield Trinity Wildcats

Rule changes include changes to the advantage rule, scrummage, marker tackle ruling, plus various changes to the out of play (ball-in-touch, touch-in-goal and dead-in-goal) rulings.

Season statistics

Table

Results

The regular league season sees the 14 teams play each other twice (one home, one away) plus an additional match, as part of the Magic Weekend, over 27 matches. The team who finishes 1st at the end of the regular season win the League Leaders' Shield.

Play-offs

The play-offs commenced following the conclusion of the 27-round regular season. To decide the grand finalists from the top eight finishing teams, Super League uses its unique play-off system. The finals concluded with the 2013 Super League Grand Final.

Bracket

Player statistics

Top try-scorers

Top try assists

Top goalscorers

Top points scorers

Discipline

Red Cards

Yellow Cards

End-of-season awards
Awards are presented for outstanding contributions and efforts to players and clubs in the week leading up to the Super League Grand Final:

The winners of the 2013 awards are:
 Man of Steel: Danny Brough (Huddersfield Giants)
 Coach of the year: Paul Anderson (Huddersfield Giants)
 Super League club of the year: St. Helens
 Young player of the year: Ben Crooks (Hull F.C.)
 Foundation of the year: Leeds Rhinos
 Rhino "Top Gun": Kevin Sinfield (Leeds Rhinos)
 Metre-maker: Jamie Peacock (Leeds Rhinos)
 Top Try Scorer: Josh Charnley (Wigan Warriors)
 Outstanding Achievement Award: Stuart Fielden (Huddersfield Giants) and Shaun Briscoe (Widnes Vikings)
 Hit Man: Danny Houghton (Hull F.C.)

Media

Television
2013 is the second year of a five-year contract with Sky Sports to televise 70 matches per season. The deal which runs until 2016 is worth £90million.

Sky Sports coverage in the UK see two live matches broadcast each week – one on Friday night, which kicks-off at 8:00 pm and another usually on Saturday evenings at 5:45 pm, although for 2013, some matches between May and August will be scheduled for Monday nights, following the introduction during the 2012 season at 8:00 pm, filling the gap vacated by the summer break of Premier League football. The Monday night fixtures switched to Thursday nights from August 2013 following the resumption of the football season and also applies to the play-off fixtures.

Regular commentators were Eddie Hemmings and Mike Stephenson with summarisers including Phil Clarke, Shaun McRae, Brian Carney, Barrie McDermott and Terry O'Connor. Sky will broadcast highlights this season in a new show on Sunday Nights called Super League - Full Time, usually airing at 10pm.

BBC Sport broadcast a highlights programme called the Super League Show, presented by Tanya Arnold. The BBC show two weekly broadcasts of the programme. The first is only to the BBC North West, Yorkshire & North Midlands, North East & Cumbria, and East Yorkshire & Lincolnshire regions on Monday evenings at 11:35pm on BBC One, while a repeat showing is shown nationally on BBC Two on Tuesday afternoons at 1.30pm. The Super League Show is also available for one week after broadcast for streaming or download via the BBC iPlayer in the UK only. End of season play-offs are shown on BBC Two across the whole country in a weekly highlights package on Sunday afternoons.

Internationally, Super League is shown live or delayed on Showtime Sports (Middle East), Māori Television (New Zealand), TV 2 Sport (Norway), NTV+ (Russia), Fox Soccer Plus (United States), Eurosport (Australia) or Sportsnet World (Canada).

Radio
BBC Coverage:

 BBC Radio 5 Live Sports Extra (National DAB Digital Radio) normally carry one Super League commentary a week on Friday Nights.
 BBC Manchester will carry commentary of Wigan and Salford whilst sharing commentary of Warrington with BBC Merseyside.
 BBC Humberside will have full match commentary of all Hull KR and Hull matches.
 BBC Leeds carry commentaries featuring Bradford, Leeds, Castleford, Wakefield and Huddersfield.
 BBC Merseyside (AM/DAB only) will have commentary on St Helens and Widnes matches whilst sharing commentary of Warrington with BBC Manchester.
 BBC London 94.9 airs all London Broncos games home & away, mainly via online streaming only.

Commercial Radio Coverage:

 102.4 Wish FM will carry commentaries of Wigan & St Helens matches.
 107.2 Wire FM will carry commentaries on Warrington & Widnes Matches.
 BCB 106.6 (Bradford Community Broadcasting) have full match commentary of Bradford Bulls home and away.
 Yorkshire Radio increases its coverage to air 50 games in the 2012 season.
 Radio Warrington (Online Station) all Warrington home games and some away games.
 Grand Sud FM covers every Catalans Dragons Home Match (in French).
 Radio France Bleu Roussillon covers every Catalans Dragons Away Match (in French).

All Super League commentaries on any station are available via the particular stations on-line streaming.

Internet
ESPN3 has worldwide broadband rights.

Starting from Thursday 9 April 2009, all of the matches shown on Sky Sports will also be available live online via Livestation everywhere in the world excluding the US, Puerto Rico, UK, Ireland, France, Monaco, Australia and New Zealand. List of Super League games available on Livestation.com

References

External links
Official Site
Super League XVII at Guardian